The Vijayabahu Infantry Regiment is an infantry regiment of the Sri Lankan Army. Formed on 22 March 1988, it is named after Vijayabahu I of Polonnaruwa (King Vijayabahu, 1055 to 1110 AD). The regiment consists of 17 regular battalions, 9 volunteer battalions and a headquarters battalion. Since 1993, its Regimental Centre is located at the Boyagane Camp, Kurunegala.

History 
Originally formed in 1982 and disbanded in 1983 follow its amalgamated with the 1st Battalion, Rajarata Rifles form the Gajaba Regiment, the regiment was reformed on 22 March 1990. The first colonel of the regiment was W. J. V. K Wimalarathna. The regimental centre commandant was H. S. A. Perera. On 23 April 1993, the regiment was relocated to Boyagane Camp in Kurunegala District. The Regiment consists of 25 battalions, the first of which was established in 1988. The Regiment numbers 655 officers and 16,501 other ranks. A new Regimental office was opened in January 2010. It features a herbal garden in remembrance of the soldiers from the regiment who have been killed in service.

The Vijayabahu Infantry Regiment has deployed two contingents in December 2006 and June 2009 to the United Nations stabilisation mission in Haiti. and on 10 December 2011, one company to the United Nations peacekeeping mission in Lebanon.

Training school 
The Vijayabahu Infantry Training School was formed at Sinhavilluwaththa Puttlam on 15 January 1991. The first chief instructor was Upali Fernando. The school has conducted over sixty courses with nearly three hundred recruits per course. Over 13,127 recruits have been trained for distribution to various regiments. Special arms courses for officers and men have also been conducted at the school.

Welfare activities 
The regiment provides death insurance for officers and other ranks. The Regiment Centre also runs the Vijayabahu Motocross, a popular annual motor racing event. The regiment has its own motor racing track, built in 1998. The aim of the motocross is to generate funds to provide welfare facilities for the families of the officers and other ranks killed or missing in action. It also aims to improve infrastructure facilities and rehabilitation work for disabled soldiers.

Sports activities 
The regiment sports a volleyball team who won the champions of the Army "A" Division volleyball tournament of 2011. Disabled soldiers of the regiment participated in the Asian Para Games – 2011, as well as Commonwealth Para Games 2011.

Seva Vanitha activities 
The Vijayabahu Seva Vanitha Branch (wives' auxiliary) supports the families of fallen soldiers. They have taken steps to facilitate the constructions work of Abimansala – Brave Hearts Wellness Resort for totally disabled war heroes by donating Rs 1.5 million on 2 September 2010, Rs 100,000.00 on 1 October 2010, Rs 5.45 million on 4 October 2010 and Rs 6 million on 11 July 2011. The total fundraising was Rs 13.05 million. The Branch has held commemoration ceremonies for the families of the killed and missing officers on 3 July 2010 and 14 May 2011 and has built 19 houses for the families of fallen and missing soldiers. The women visit Ranaviru Sevana, Military and Mental Hospital, Mullariyawa.

Fallen Officers 
 Colonel Gamini Fernando  1 June 1995 – Commanding Officer of 1st Vijayabahu Infantry Regiment
 Colonel Nizam Dane   24 June 1997– Commanding Officer of the 10th Battalion of the Vijayaba Infantry Regiment
 Lt. Colonel T. R. A. Aliba  18 July 1996- Commanding Officer of the 6th Battalion of the Vijayaba Infantry Regiment in the Battle of Mullaitivu (1996)
 Lt. Colonel N. H. K Silva  18 July 1996
 Major Janaka Kasturiarachchi  18 July 1996 – Brigade Major, 25 Brigade in the Battle of Mullaitivu (1996)
 Major C. N. Siyambalangoda

Units

Order of precedence

See also
 Sri Lanka Army
 Gajaba Regiment

References

External links and sources
 Sri Lanka Army
 Vijayabahu Infantry Regiment
 Unsung VIR Soldiers Commended

Infantry regiments of the Sri Lankan Army
Military units and formations established in 1988